On 24 June 2021, several students were kidnapped in Birnin Yauri, Kebbi, Nigeria. The van used belonged to a former judge. A policeman was killed, and five students rescued.

References

2021 crimes in Nigeria
Kidnapping
Attacks on schools in Nigeria
Kidnapping
June 2021 crimes in Africa
Kidnappings in Nigeria
Mass kidnappings of the 2020s